Merge Mansion is a mobile game for Android and iOS released in 2020. It is the first game by Metacore. The company is based in Finland, as stated on Merge Mansion's YouTube channel about page. As of August 16, 2021 it has been downloaded over 40 million times.  In less than a year it generated $38.6 million. However, the advertisements by Metacore in promotion for the game are what pushed Merge Mansion onto the map. The game was promoted with ads described as "weird", "dramatic", "plot-driven", "interesting", and created for "virality". The official gameplay soundtrack, titled "Merge Mansion (Official Gameplay Soundtrack)", was released on the 16th of April, 2022. It featured 12 tracks.

Gameplay
Merge Mansion is a puzzle game where the player completes tasks as the character Maddie whose grandmother (Grandma Ursula) owns the mansion.

The game starts with Grandma Ursula handing Maddie a set of keys, which turn out to unlock the gate of the mansion. Maddie has to renovate the surroundings by cleaning and repairing everything or the entire place will be condemned. During gameplay you merge existing items and spawn new ones in order to clean up different areas of the mansion. As the player unlocks new areas, the story unfolds and Grandma Ursula reveals some of their family mysteries.

Players need to merge two items to create a brand new, upgraded item. These items include tools, furniture, plants, etc. For example, two knives turn into pruning shears, while two lightbulbs make a post light. These are some of the things players need to renovate the mansion and progress through the narrative.

Advertisements
Merge Mansion's advertising campaigns have received notable attention on the internet from famous YouTube content creators, such as Danny Gonzalez and MatPat. A series of live-action advertisements were created, hiring Kathy Bates as the actor of Grandma Ursula and Grace Rex as the granddaughter Maddie. Bates described the filming experience as "so much fun". The advertisements were created in collaboration with W+K and were directed by Jim Jenkins. All advertising campaigns created have been posted to their YouTube channel, garnering more than 6 million views and 35,000 subscribers in total as of January 5, 2022. It is unknown where the ads were filmed, but the mobile game advertisements were set in Montgomery County in Maryland, USA.

The campaigns have not gone without criticism. Many have noted the similarities between the mobile game Lily's Garden's ads and Merge Mansion's. On top of this, it has been criticized that the gameplay is not fully true to the ads, gameplay is similar to Candy Crush in its simplicity. Even so, Metacore has managed to set Merge Mansion different compared to other games by focusing the story of the game and not having no connection whatsover for advertised game game (such as Whispers, Choices, Homescapes and Gardenscapes). Despite all the criticism, Merge Mansion's campaign online is still going strong, especially on social media site Instagram.

References

External links 
 Official website

2020 video games
Android (operating system) games
IOS games
Puzzle video games
Video games developed in Finland
Video games featuring female protagonists